A.S.D. Casinò di Venezia Calcio a Cinque was a futsal club based in Venezia, Veneto, Italy.

Famous players
 Marco Ercolessi

External links
Official Website

Sport in Venice
Futsal clubs in Italy
1997 establishments in Italy
2013 disestablishments in Italy
Futsal clubs established in 1997
Sports clubs disestablished in 2013